Abdelmounaïm El Hajaoui (born 30 August 1984) is a Moroccan footballer currently playing for French lower league side ASFAC Frontignan. He has formerly played in the Ligue 2 for Nîmes Olympique, as well as Paris FC and Sète 34 .

References 

1984 births
Living people
Moroccan footballers
Moroccan expatriate footballers
Expatriate footballers in France
Ligue 2 players
Championnat National players
Botola players
FC Sète 34 players
Nîmes Olympique players
Paris FC players
Hassania Agadir players
Canet Roussillon FC players
People from Errachidia
Association football midfielders